During the 2000–01 English football season, Wycombe Wanderers competed in the Football League Second Division.

Season summary
Having barely escaped relegation the previous season, this time round Wycombe achieved survival in the Second Division by a comfortable margin. Their defensive record, the best of any team outside the top six, ensured they finished well clear of relegation in 13th place. Wycombe enjoyed their greatest success in the FA Cup, defeating First Division teams Grimsby Town, Wolverhampton Wanderers and Wimbledon before edging Premier League side Leicester City 2–1 at Filbert Street; this result caused Leicester, then sitting fourth in the Premier League, to enter a poor run of form that dragged them down to 13th. The win at Leicester set up a dream semi-final tie against Liverpool at Villa Park – Wycombe pushed Gérard Houllier's men all the way before losing 2–1; Liverpool would go on to finish third in the Premier League and win a treble of the League, FA and UEFA Cups.

Final league table

Results
Wycombe Wanderers' score comes first

Legend

FA Cup

League Cup

Squad

Left club during season

References

Wycombe Wanderers
Wycombe Wanderers F.C. seasons